Straight Ahead is the debut solo album of Wipers frontman Greg Sage. It was released in 1985. Half the album consists of just Sage accompanied by his acoustic guitar.

J Mascis covered "On the Run" on his 1996 solo album, Martin + Me. Ryan Adams covered the title track at the Xponential show on 26 July 2014.

Sage said of this album, "After I recorded Over The Edge, I had $5,000 invested into that record. The record company went bankrupt, so they took the money and started a new label. We got screwed and I had no way of paying back the debt, so that was the end of The Wipers. I was out in the Mohave desert and I wrote a bunch of songs on the acoustic guitar, I fixed a tape recorder for somebody. An eight track recorder, so I got to use it for a month as a fee for fixing it, I guess. I just recorded those songs. Then one day someone called from a record label, a guy that used to work for the label that screwed us, and he said "I feel sorry for you guys" and I told him that I didn't have any Wipers stuff for him and that The Wipers didn't exist anymore. Anyway, the label, licensed Straight Ahead, a live record, some old tapes and basically got me out of debt for Over The Edge. If I never recorded those songs, Over The Edge would've been The Wipers' last record."

Track listing
All songs written by Greg Sage:
"Straight Ahead" - 4:12
"Soul's Tongue" - 2:45
"Blue Cowboy" - 3:10
"Your Empathy" - 2:58
"The Illusion Fades" - 2:37
"Seems So Clear" - 1:35
"On the Run" - 2:12
"Astro Cloud" - 4:08
"Lost in Space" - 3:25
"Let It Go" - 3:08
"World Without Fear" - 5:05
"Keep on Keepin' On" - 4:22

References

1985 debut albums
Wipers albums